James Marshall (3 January 1908 – 27 December 1977) was a Scottish footballer who played for Rangers and Arsenal, as well as the Scotland national side. He played as an inside forward.

Career

Club
Marshall was born in Avonbridge, Stirlingshire and joined Rangers from Shettleston in 1925. During his nine-year spell at Ibrox he amassed five League championships and three Scottish Cups. In total he scored 137 goals in 243 appearances for Rangers in all competitions.

Marshall was a qualified doctor, gaining his medical degree in October 1933, and it was a medical appointment in London that caused him to leave Rangers and join Arsenal in July 1934. Marshall made his debut for the club on 17 September 1934 against Blackburn Rovers in a 2–0 defeat. He also went on to score in Arsenal's 4–0 defeat of Manchester City in that season's Charity Shield. As so with Alex James, Ray Bowden and Bobby Davidson keeping him out of the side, he only made four league appearances for Arsenal.

He left Arsenal in March 1935, to move to West Ham United for £5,000. Marshall spent two seasons there where he scored 13 goals in 59 appearances.  He eventually retired at the relatively early age of 29. Marshall continued to practice medicine in London within the Bermondsey area. He died in 1977, at the age of sixty-nine.

International
Marshall won three Scotland caps, all of them against England between 1932 and 1934, and all while playing for Rangers.

Honours
Rangers
Scottish League Championship: 1926–27, 1928–29, 1929–30, 1930–31, 1932–33, 1933–34
Scottish FA Cup: 1929–30, 1931–32, 1933–34

Arsenal
FA Charity Shield: 1934

References

Sources

Scottish footballers
Scotland international footballers
Arsenal F.C. players
Rangers F.C. players
West Ham United F.C. players
1908 births
1977 deaths
Association football inside forwards
Scottish Football League players
English Football League players
Scottish Football League representative players
Footballers from Falkirk (council area)
Scottish Junior Football Association players
Glasgow United F.C. players
Place of death missing